This is a list of monuments that are classified by the Moroccan ministry of culture around Fez, Morocco.

Monuments and sites in Fez 

|}

References 

Fez
Fez, Morocco